Frederick Drimmer (August 7, 1916 – December 24, 2000) was an American author, best known for his explorations of the bizarre and macabre. His Very Special People was about famous sideshow performers and the deformed, such as the conjoined twins Giacomo and Giovanni Battista Tocci.   He also wrote The Elephant Man, a book about Joseph Merrick, who suffered from Proteus Syndrome, and Until You are Dead..., concerning the history of executions in the United States.

Born in Brooklyn, Drimmer received a bachelor's degree from City College of New York and a master's degree from Columbia University. He served in the Navy during World War II. He also taught at Norwalk Community College and City College of New York.

Bibliography

Drimmer, Frederick, Compiler. A Friend Is Someone Special. Norwalk, Connecticut: The C.R. Gibson Company Publishers, 1975.
Drimmer, Frederick, Daughters of Eve.
Drimmer, Frederick. In Search of Eden

References

Frederick Drimmer's obituary at the New York Times

1916 births
2000 deaths
American male biographers
20th-century American historians
American male non-fiction writers
20th-century American biographers
20th-century American male writers